Rhynchopyga ichneumonea is a species of moth in the subfamily Arctiinae. It is found in Colombia.

References

Moths described in 1869
Euchromiina